Lavena Ponte Tresa is a comune (municipality) on Lake Lugano in the Province of Varese in the Italian region Lombardy, located about  northwest of Milan and about  north of Varese, on the border with Switzerland.

Lavena Ponte Tresa borders the following municipalities: Brusimpiano, Cadegliano-Viconago, Caslano (Switzerland), Marzio, Tresa (Switzerland).

Sister cities
  Mesoraca
  Lacedonia
  Aquilonia
  Calitri

References

External links

Cities and towns in Lombardy
Italy–Switzerland border crossings
Populated places on Lake Lugano